The Chief of the Defence Forces (: CDF, Jawi: ڤڠليما اڠکتن تنترا) is the professional head of the Malaysian Armed Forces and the most senior uniformed military adviser to the Yang di-Pertuan Agong (YDPA; 'King of Malaysia'), the Prime Minister and the Minister of Defence. The CDF is based at Wisma Pertahanan, Kuala Lumpur, nearby to the Ministry of Defence. The CDF is the highest rank in Malaysia Armed Forces only after the YDPA which hold the title Commander-in-Chief.

Also known as "Perintah Ulung" ( 'Superior Command'), the CDF is part of Armed Forces Council together with Minister of Defence, YPDA's representative, Chief of Army, Chief of Navy, Chief of Air Force, Chief of Staff and so on. CDF can be appointed from all three branch of Malaysia Armed Force—Malaysian Army, Royal Malaysian Navy and Royal Malaysian Air Force.

The Panglima Angkatan Tentera (PAT) was formerly known as Ketua Turus Angkatan Tentera (KTAT) until in the early 1980s.

The current CDF is General Tan Sri Affendi Buang  – having succeeded his predecessor, General Tan Sri Zulkifli Zainal Abidin on 2 January 2020.

History 
The United Kingdom governed Malaysia in its pre-independence days. Most of its military forces at that time is from Commonwealth nations. There is local military force such as the Penang and Province Wellesley Volunteer Corps, and other similar units created in Singapore and the other Malay States, however, it is more as a territorial army than as a federal army.

The Federal Council of the Federated Malay States passed the Malay Regiment Bill on 23 January 1933. With that, the first local federal military forces, the Malay Regiment (now known as the Royal Malay Regiment) formed.

After World War II, with the Malayan Emergency conflict emerges, the Malay Regiment increased to seven battalions. One multiracial regiment and one armoured vehicle squadron also formed. With this, the regiments merged into one single federal army, thus forming the Malayan Federation Army, the Malaysian Army predecessor. At that time, even with combinations with other branches (Navy and Air Force), the Malayan Armed Forces were relatively small. As the chief of the biggest branch of the armed forces, the Chief of Army was at the same time elected as the chief of the entire armed forces.

With Malaysia formation on 16 September 1963, North Borneo (now known as Sabah), Crown Colony of Sarawak (now known as Sarawak) and Singapore military forces merged with the Malayan Armed Forces into one single force. Because of this, the Chief of Armed Forces separated from the Chief of Army for ease of administration of the larger army.

List of Chief of Defence Forces 
Until 2020, 21 people had appointed as the Chief of Defence Forces, including two from Royal Malaysian Air Forces and one from Royal Malaysian Navy.

References 

Military of Malaysia
Malaysia